Charles Marie René Leconte de Lisle (22 October 1818 – 17 July 1894) was a French poet of the Parnassian movement. He is traditionally known by his surname only, Leconte de Lisle.

Biography
Leconte de Lisle was born on the French overseas island of La Réunion, in the Indian Ocean. He spent his childhood there and later in Brittany. Among his friends in those years was the musician Charles Bénézit. His father, an army surgeon who brought Leconte up with great severity, sent him to travel in the East Indies intending to prepare him for a business career. However, after returning from this journey, the young man preferred to complete his education in Rennes, Brittany, specializing in Greek, Italian and history. In 1845 he settled definitively in Paris.

He was involved in the French Revolution of 1848 which ended with the overthrow of the Orleans King Louis-Philppe of France, but took no further part in politics after the Second Republic was declared.

His first volume, La Vénus de Milo, attracted to him a number of friends many of whom were passionately devoted to classical literature. However, as a writer he is most famous for his three collections of poetry: Poèmes antiques (1852), Poèmes barbares (1862), Poèmes tragiques (1884). He is also known for his translations of Ancient Greek tragedians and poets, such as Aeschylus, Sophocles, Euripides and Horace.

Leconte de Lisle played a leading role in the Parnassian poetic movement (1866) and shared many of the values of other poets of this generation, bridging the Romantic and Symbolist periods.

Although Leconte de Lisle was a fervent Republican, during the reign of Napoleon III he accepted the pensions and decorations offered to him by the Emperor. This was held against him after the fall of the Second Empire and its replacement by the Third Republic, in 1871.

However, Leconte de Lisle redeemed himself with the new government by writing two democratically-oriented books entitled A People's History of the French Revolution and A People's History of Christianity, respectively. These works earned him a post as Assistant Librarian at the Luxembourg Palace in 1873; in 1886 he was elected to the French Academy, in succession to Victor Hugo.

Personal life
Leconte de Lisle married Anna Adélaïde Perray (March 29, 1833 - September 8, 1916), daughter of Jacques Perray and Amélie Leconte, in Paris on September 10, 1857; they had no children.

Leconte de Lisle died on 17 July 1894 at Voisins in the township of Louveciennes, to the west of Paris.

Works
As well as poetry, Leconte de Lisle produced a number of theatrical plays, lyrical works, translations, and historical works. His works are shown below, in chronological order.

References

Bibliography
J. Dornis: Leconte de Lisle intime (1895)
F. Calmette: Un Demi siècle littéraire, Leconte de Lisle et ses amis (1902)
Paul Bourget: Nouveaux essais de psychologie contemporaine (1885)
Ferdinand Brunetière: L'Évolution de la poésie lyrique en France au XIX" siècle (1894)
Maurice Spronck: Les Artistes littéraires (1889)
Jules Lemaître: Les Contemporains (2nd series, 1886)
F. Brunetière: Nouveaux essais sur la littérature contemporaine'' (1895)
Complete poetry work of Leconte de Lisle 
 This includes a lengthy critical review, focusing on Leconte de Lisle's place in the Parnassian movement.

External links

 
 
 

1818 births
1894 deaths
19th-century French male writers
19th-century poets
Burials at Montparnasse Cemetery
French librarians
French male poets
French poets
Members of the Académie Française
People from Réunion
People of French descent from Réunion
Prince des poètes
Translators of Ancient Greek texts
University of Rennes alumni
Writers from Réunion
19th-century translators
Translators of Homer